Aghcheh Kand (also Romanized as Āghcheh Kand; also known as Āqcheh Kand) is a village in Abarghan Rural District, in the Central District of Sarab County, East Azerbaijan Province, Iran. At the 2006 census, its population was 174, in 35 families.

References 

Populated places in Sarab County